The Columbia Brewery is a brewery that was a part of the Fort Steele Brewery which was established in 1898 by Fritz Sick in Creston, British Columbia.

Production 
The brewery is known for Kokanee, a light Pilsner-style beer with 5.0% alcohol v/v. In the past, Kokanee beers were canned near Vancouver, British Columbia.

See also 
 Kokanee beer
 Labatt Brewing Company
 InBev

References

External links 
 Fort Steele Archives

Beer brewing companies based in British Columbia
Companies based in British Columbia
Labatt Brewing Company